The Gravatá River is a river of Paraíba state in western Brazil.

See also
List of rivers of Paraíba

References

Rivers of Paraíba